Mobberley is a village in Cheshire, England.

Mobberley or Mobberley may also refer to:
 7239 Mobberley, a minor planet
 Mobberly Hotel, Longview, Texas

People with the surname
 Alan Mobberley (born 1948), British car designer
 Andrew Mobberley (born 1992), Samoan footballer
 Herb Mobberley (1904–1988), Canadian football player
 James Mobberley (born 1954), American composer, music teacher and guitarist
 John Mobberly, (C. 1844–1865), Confederate guerrilla in the American Civil War
 Martin Mobberley (born 1958), British amateur astronomer

See also